Paul Thomas Gillcrist (March 22, 1929 – June 30, 2016) was a rear admiral in the United States Navy. After retirement from the Navy, he wrote non-fiction and fiction books and was a consultant for television.

Early life and education
Born in Chicago and raised in Freeport, Long Island, Gillcrist was a 1952 graduate of the United States Naval Academy. After attending flight school, he was designated a naval aviator in December 1953. Gillcrist was also an October 1958 graduate of the Naval Test Pilot School.

Career
His first deployment was with the "Satan's Kittens" of VF-191 flying from the carrier . Gillcrist was given command of the squadron from March 1967 to March 1968 during his last two deployments.

Gillcrist was a former Assistant Deputy Chief of Naval Operations for Air Warfare, a position he served from 1982 to 1985. Previously, he served as Commander, Naval Base San Diego, Assistant Chief of Staff for Operations for the Commander in Chief of the Atlantic Command, Commander of Carrier Air Wing THREE deployed on the carrier , Commanding Officer of Naval Air Station Cecil Field, and as Commander of Fighter Airborne Early Warning Wings of the U.S. Pacific Fleet (COMFITAEWWING). He is an alumnus of Gonzaga University and the United States Naval Academy.

In 1981 at the age of 51, Gillcrist became the first flag officer to land an F-14 Tomcat on an aircraft carrier.

He wrote novels as well as books on aviation and naval science topics.

Following his retirement, he became a technical consultant for the movie Thirteen Days and the television show JAG. He died on June 30, 2016 and was interred at Miramar National Cemetery.

Awards
His awards include the Distinguished Service Medal, Distinguished Flying Cross, Bronze Star, Air Medal (13), and the Republic of Vietnam Gallantry Cross. In 1985, he was named Tailhook Aviator of the Year by the Tailhook Association.

Books
 Gillcrist, Paul T. Cobra. [Place of publication not identified]: [1st Books Library], 2000. 
 Gillcrist, Paul T. Crusader!: Last of the Gunfighters. Atglen, PA: Schiffer Pub, 1995. 
 Gillcrist, Paul T. Deadly Windfall: A Novel. Lincoln, NE: iUniverse, 2006. 
 Gillcrist, Paul T. Feet Wet: Reflections of a Carrier Pilot. Novato, CA: Presidio Press, 1990.  
 Gillcrist, Paul T. Sea Legs. San Jose, CA: Writer's Showcase, presented by Writer's Digest, 2000. 
 Gillcrist, Dan, Robert Gillcrist, and Paul T. Gillcrist. Spindrift: Stories from the Sea Services. Atglen, PA: Schiffer Military/Aviation History, 1998. 
 Gillcrist, Paul T. Tomcat!: The Grumman F-14 Story. Atglen, PA: Schiffer Pub, 1994.

References

1929 births
2016 deaths
Military personnel from Chicago
United States Naval Academy alumni
United States Naval Aviators
United States Naval Test Pilot School alumni
United States Navy personnel of the Vietnam War
Recipients of the Air Medal
Recipients of the Distinguished Flying Cross (United States)
United States Navy rear admirals
Recipients of the Navy Distinguished Service Medal
American male writers
Burials at Miramar National Cemetery